Gode Airport, also known as Ugas Mirad Airport ,  is an airport in Gode, Ethiopia. Located at an elevation of 254 meters above sea level, it has one runway made of a variety of materials 2288 meters long by 35 wide.

Construction of the airport began in 1965 by the Swedish construction firm Skanska, and was formally inaugurated by Emperor Haile Selassie on 10 June 1966. Although originally a military air base, Gode Airport was afterwards also used for civil flights.

Airlines and destinations

References

External links
Ethiopian Airlines Routes

Airports in Ethiopia
Somali Region